Requieniidae is a family of rudists, in the order Hippuritida, which lived from 155.7 to 66.043 million years ago.

Taxonomy 
Placed by the WoRMS and Fossilworks.

Family Requieniidae Kutassy, 1934

 Subfamily: Matheroniinae
 Genus: Hypelasma
 Genus: Kugleria
 Genus: Lovetchenia
 Genus: Matheronia
 Genus: Rutonia
 Subfamily: Requieniinae
 Genus: Apricardia
 Genus: Bayleia
 Genus: Bayleoidea
 Genus: Pseudotoucasia
 Genus: Requienia
 Genus: Toucasia

References

Prehistoric bivalve families
Hippuritida